Debra Dabney Austin is a professor at Florida State University, and she served as chancellor of the State University System of Florida from 2003 to 2005.

Austin is originally from Michigan. She earned a bachelor's degree in English from Michigan State University, and a master's degree in English from the University of Florida. She received her master's in business administration and a doctorate in higher education administration from Florida State University. Prior to becoming chancellor, Austin served as assistant vice president for academic affairs at Florida State University.

References

External links
Official Professor Profile at FSU
Press Release Austin is named Chancellor

University of Florida alumni
Living people
Michigan State University alumni
Florida State University alumni
Chancellors of the State University System of Florida
Year of birth missing (living people)